John Augustus Voelcker CIE (24 June 1854 - 6 November 1937) was an English agricultural chemist and the second son of the German-born English chemist Augustus Voelcker (1822–1884). John Augustus (jr.) succeeded his father as consulting chemist to the Royal Agricultural Society and continued research on soil fertility. He headed a committee that examined issues in Indian agriculture in 1891.

Early life and career 
John was the second of five sons of Augustus Voelcker and born at Cirencester. After school he studied chemistry under Temple Orme before joining University College where his chemistry teacher was Professor Williamson. He was also a long distance runner and a member of the London Athletic Club. Voelcker then, like his father, studied chemistry in Giessen and received a doctorate for work on the composition of apatite and natural forms of calcium phosphate. He then returned to England to work with his father's laboratory. After the death of his father in 1884, he continued the experiments on the Woburn Experimental Station. One of the key findings at Woburn was the finding that sulphate of ammonia use in acidic soils led to the loss of soil nutrients by the leaching of calcium sulphate from the soil.

Indian agriculture 

In 1889, Voelcker was requested, on the recommendation of Sir James Caird, by the Secretary of State for India to examine improvements in Indian agriculture. He then spent a full year travelling around India and producing a 450-page report of recommendations. Voelcker's travels and enquiries led to his noting that Indian agriculture was highly varied across the country, defying generalization, and that some of the farming practices were as good as they could be. He called for a systematic study for the improvement of farming systems. The department of agriculture had been dissolved but Voelcker met a key person associated with it in the past, Hume. Hume had been highly critical of British policy in India. Voelcker also met Robert H. Elliot who was against artificial fertilizers. With regard to soil fertility, he noted that in areas where fuel was in short supply, that cattle manure was used for burning and not returned to the soil. He suggested that this could be ameliorated through the establishment of fuelwood plantations. It has been suggested that Voelcker's report was in many places a social critique, partly of imperialism. Following Voelcker's suggestion and in the face of impending famines, English chemist J. Walter Leather (1860-14 November 1934) was appointed agricultural chemist. Lord Curzon read the report and took various measures to re-establish a department of agriculture to coordinate policy across the country. Curzon appointed James W. Mollison from Bombay as the first Inspector General of Agriculture in 1901. For his contributions to Indian agriculture, Voelcker was made Companion of the Order of the Indian Empire in 1928.

Personal life
Voelcker was a devout Christian who attended the St. John's Presbyterian Church at Kensington. He married Alice Westgarth in 1884 and they had two sons and two daughters. The older son died young and the second died in the war. A mineral was named after him as Voelckerite but it was subsequently identified as being a form of fluorapatite.

References

External links 
 Report on the improvement of Indian agriculture (1893)
 Russell, E. J. and J A Voelcker (1916) Fifty years of field experiments at the Woburn experimental station. Longmans, Green and Co.

English chemists
1854 births
1937 deaths